Larry Price is an athlete, media personality, journalist and former civil servant in Hawaii, United States.  A resident of Honolulu, he is currently an author, political news columnist for MidWeek and radio co-host of the locally popular Perry & Price on KSSK-FM alongside Michael W. Perry.  He also writes and produces television documentaries.  Price was formerly an investigative reporter for Honolulu ABC network affiliate KITV. In celebration of its centennial, the City and County of Honolulu named Price to its official list of Top 100 Citizens.

Education
Price attended President Theodore Roosevelt High School in Honolulu.  Price holds several college degrees: a Bachelor of Science degree in 1967 and Master of Business Administration in 1971 from the University of Hawaii at Manoa.  He also holds a 1985 Doctor of Philosophy from the University of Southern California and completed post-doctoral work at Stanford University from 1997 to 2003. He continues to teach as MBA professor at Chaminade University of Honolulu.

Athletics
Price attended Roosevelt High School and then participated as a student-athlete briefly on the University of Hawaii at Manoa track team. After serving in the U.S. Army, Price was a student-athlete who won four letters with the Hawaii Warriors football team. Price was elected captain three times, in 1962, 1963, and 1964. He played in three Hula Bowl games for the Hawaii All-Stars in 1957 and 1959 and as a College All-Star in 1965. In 1966 NFL preseason, Price had a free agent rookie tryout with the Los Angeles Rams. Price was the University of Hawaii at Manoa's first NCAA Division I head coach; he was also the first head coach of an NCAA Division I FBS college football program of Polynesian descent. He currently serves as Chairman of the State of Hawaii Sports Hall of Fame Cybermuseum and President of The OIA Foundation.

Head coaching record

Radio personality
Before working at KSSK, Price worked for the administration of Hawaii Governor George Ariyoshi and served as the University of Hawaii Director of the Small Business Management Program. Congressman Cecil Heftel needed a new vice president of public relations and publicity for his radio station and hired Price for the position in 1977.  In August 1983, Price was paired with afternoon radio deejay Michael W. Perry to host the station's morning drive program. A top rated program in the state, the two continue to host the same program today despite various station ownership changes.

Perry and Price host a popular live radio variety show each Saturday in front of a ballroom audience.  Over twenty years, it had been broadcast from the Champeaux at the Ilikai Hotel, the Hanohano Room of the Sheraton Waikiki Hotel, John Dominis Restaurant in Waikiki, and after 6 years at Jimmy Buffett's at the Beachcomber, and the show had its final broadcast from the KSSK studios at Dole Cannery.  The show's popularity has garnered frequent appearances by celebrities that include Arnold Schwarzenegger, Dolly Parton, Oprah Winfrey and many more.

In May 2016 at the age of 81, Price ended his 33-year run as a co-host of the Perry and Price show. Price simultaneously announced he would begin a new sports show with Rick Hamada on KIKI: FOX Sports 990 Hawai'i, airing Saturdays at 11 a.m.

References

Year of birth missing (living people)
Living people
American radio personalities
Hawaii Rainbow Warriors football coaches
Hawaii Rainbow Warriors football players
Chaminade University of Honolulu faculty
President Theodore Roosevelt High School alumni